Love You So Much is the fifth Mandarin studio album produced by Hong Kong-based singer Kelly Chen. It was released on April 20, 2000, by Go East Entertainment Company/Decca Records in Hong Kong and Taiwan, and reached number five on the IFPI Hong Kong chart on April 27, 2000.

Six singles were released from the album. The lead single, "Hey, Anyone Out Here? (喂！有人在嗎？)" is a psychedelic soul song and was released on September 10, 1999. It was unusual at the time to release a single of this genre (since Taiwanese people primarily listened to traditional sentimental ballads), and the single was not successful. The follow-up, "If You Really Love Me (你若是真愛我)", was a sentimental ballad which was also unsuccessful.

Composition
Love You So Much is a pop ballads record and primarily consists of pop songs. The album integrates pop with influences from many different genres, including sentimental ballad, psychedelic soul, acid house, and electronica.

Lyrically, the album consists of songs that mainly talk about love and personal lives.

Track listing

CD

Taiwan Deluxe Celebration Edition:Bonus 5" CD single

Release history

References

Kelly Chen albums
2000 albums